Soufian Moro (born 21 February 1993) is a Dutch footballer who plays as a winger for DHSC. He formerly played for FC Utrecht, PEC Zwolle and Fortuna Sittard.

Career
On 2 January 2019, DVS '33 announced that they had signed Moro on loan for the rest of the season from IJsselmeervogels. He joined the club permanently at the loan spell ended.

In February 2020, it was announced that he would move to Hoofdklasse club DHSC from the beginning of the next season.

References

External links
 Voetbal International profile 
 Profile at DVS '33

1993 births
Living people
Dutch footballers
FC Utrecht players
PEC Zwolle players
Fortuna Sittard players
Eredivisie players
Footballers from Amsterdam
Association football midfielders
IJsselmeervogels players
DVS '33 players
Derde Divisie players
DHSC players